Joan Baez in San Francisco is a demonstration record by Joan Baez which was recorded in 1958, when Baez was seventeen years old. It was released without permission by Fantasy Records in 1964. Baez sued to block its distribution and it was withdrawn. It was released by Bear Family Records as "A Package of Joan Baez".

Tracking list

Side A
 "Island in the Sun"  (Harry Belafonte, Irving Burgie)
 "Water Boy" (Traditional) 
 "Annie Had a Baby" (Henry Glover, Lois Mann)
 "Oh Freedom" (Traditional) 
 "Man Smart, Woman Smarter" (Norman Span, D. L. Miller, F. Kuhn, and Charles Harris) 
 "Scarlet Ribbons" (Evelyn Danzig, Jack Segal)

Side B
 "Dark as a Dungeon" (Merle Travis) 
 "Told My Captain" (Traditional) 
 "Young Blood" (Jerry Leiber, Mike Stoller, Doc Pomus) 
 "I Gave My Love a Cherry" (Traditional) 
 "La Bamba" (Traditional) 
 "Every Night" (Traditional)

Personnel
 Joan Baez - acoustic guitar, vocals
 Eirik Wangberg - mixing

References

Joan Baez albums
1964 albums